Weh or WEH may refer to:

People
 Allen Weh, American politician
 Erik Evju, Norwegian musician (stage name: Weh)

Places
 Weh Island, Indonesia
 Weihai Dashuibo Airport, China (IATA code)
 West Ham station, London, England (station code)
 Western Express Highway, Mumbai, India
 Western Express Highway metro station

Other uses
 Weh language, spoken in Cameroon
 Wireless energy harvesting

German-language surnames
Surnames of German origin
Surnames of Liberian origin